The Road Safety Remuneration Tribunal (RSRT) was an independent body established by the Gillard government in 2012 to oversee the road transport industry in Australia. The jurisdiction of the RSRT is set out in the Road Safety Remuneration Act 2012.

Background

The Transport Workers Union of Australia issued a "Safe Rates" campaign in response to reports of a link between rates of pay and road safety. 

In the lead-up to the 2013 Australian federal election, Tony Abbott promised to issue a review of the industrial tribunal.

In 2016, a dispute between owner-truck drivers in the road transport industry accelerated calls for the tribunal to be abolished, and the tribunal was abolished on 21 April 2016.

References

External links
 

Australian labour law
Industrial agreements
Gillard Government
Former Commonwealth of Australia courts and tribunals
2012 establishments in Australia
2016 disestablishments in Australia